The Middle Township Public Schools are a comprehensive community public school district that serves students in kindergarten through twelfth grade from Middle Township, in Cape May County, New Jersey, United States.

As of the 2018–19 school year, the district, comprising four schools, had an enrollment of 2,608 students and 208.0 classroom teachers (on an FTE basis), for a student–teacher ratio of 12.5:1.

The district is classified by the New Jersey Department of Education as being in District Factor Group "B", the second-lowest of eight groupings. District Factor Groups organize districts statewide to allow comparison by common socioeconomic characteristics of the local districts. From lowest socioeconomic status to highest, the categories are A, B, CD, DE, FG, GH, I and J.

Students from Avalon, Dennis Township, Stone Harbor and Woodbine attend the district's high school as part of sending/receiving relationships.

History
In 2013 Woodbine School District changed its receiving high school district from Millville School District to Middle Township district. The first group of Woodbine 9th graders to Middle Township High began attending in fall 2013. Lynda Anderson-Towns, superintendent of the Woodbine district, cited the closer proximity and smaller size of Middle Township High.

Schools
Schools in the district (with 2018–19 enrollment data from the National Center for Education Statistics) are:
Elementary schools
Middle Township Elementary School #1 with 670 students in grades PreK-2
Christian J. Paskalides, Principal
Middle Township Elementary School #2 with 563 students in grades 3-5
Nancy Loteck, Principal
Middle school
Middle Township Middle School with 533 students in grades 6-8
Jeffrey Ortman, Principal 
High schools
Middle Township High School with 767 students in grades 9-12
George West III, Principal

All four schools and the district headquarters are in Cape May Court House CDP.

In the era of de jure educational segregation in the United States, a school for white children in grades 1-6 was maintained in Rio Grande and a school for black children was maintained in Whitesboro in grades 1-8. White children in Rio Grande were sent to West Cape May School District for grades 7-12.

Administration
Core members of the district's administration are:
Dr. David Salvo, Superintendent
Diane S. Fox, Business Administrator / Board Secretary

Board of education
The district's board of education, with nine members, sets policy and oversees the fiscal and educational operation of the district through its administration. As a Type II school district, the board's trustees are elected directly by voters to serve three-year terms of office on a staggered basis, with three seats up for election each year held (since 2012) as part of the November general election. A tenth board member is appointed to represent Dennis Township.

Academic achievement

The district was categorized in 2005 as being "In Need of Improvement" under the terms of the No Child Left Behind Act.

Student body

In 2008 the district had about 2,879 students.

References

External links

Middle Township Public Schools
 
School Data for the Middle Township Public Schools, National Center for Education Statistics

Middle Township, New Jersey
Dennis Township, New Jersey
New Jersey District Factor Group B
School districts in Cape May County, New Jersey